Chioma Nnamaka (born June 15, 1985 in Uppsala, Sweden) is a Swedish professional female basketball player and a member of Sweden women's national basketball team.

High school and college
Nnamaka attended high school at Fryshusets Kunskaps Centrum. While playing basketball, she helped her team to win the Swedish Championship on three occasions. Nnamaka then went to the United States to attend the Georgia Institute of Technology. She made the Dean's list studying International Affairs, and played basketball for the Georgia Tech Yellow Jackets women's basketball team.

Georgia Tech statistics

Source

WNBA
Nnamaka was selected 21st overall in the 2008 WNBA Draft, by the San Antonio Silver Stars via their first pick. She was the highest draft pick ever chosen from Georgia Tech. She was then traded on the same day to the expansion-team Atlanta Dream, where she completed her rookie season. On January 14, 2009 Nnamaka was waived from the roster.

Honors and activities
Co-Captain of Georgia Institute of Technology Women’s Basketball Team (2006-present)
All Atlantic Coast Conference Freshman Team (2004)
Atlantic Coast Conference Rookie of the week (December 2004)
Most Valuable Player of the Swedish Championship (2003)

References

External links
Player profile at WNBA.com

1985 births
Living people
Atlanta Dream players
Club Sportiv Municipal Târgoviște players
Georgia Tech Yellow Jackets women's basketball players
San Antonio Silver Stars draft picks
Shooting guards
Sportspeople from Uppsala
Swedish expatriate basketball people in Lithuania
Swedish expatriate basketball people in the United States
Swedish expatriate sportspeople in Romania
Swedish expatriates in France
Swedish expatriates in Poland
Swedish women's basketball players